Twin Rivers Golf Course, is a public golf course located near the village of Port Blandford in Newfoundland, Canada. 
It is part of the Terra Nova Golf Resort located in Terra Nova National Park.

History
Twin Rivers Course opened in August 1984 as a nine-hole public course in Terra Nova National Park. Robbie Robinson designed the original nine holes, while Doug Carrick designed the second nine holes, which opened in July 1991.

In 1993, Sports Villas Resorts Inc. began operating the Twin Rivers course and named the hotel and golf course property as the Terra Nova Park Lodge & Golf Course, renamed Terra Nova Golf Resort in 2001.

The course
Twin Rivers Golf Course has been given the rank of Platinum by the Canadian Golf Course Ranking Magazine, Score Magazine for the past three years, ranking the course as one of the top 30 courses in Canada and one of the top six in Atlantic Canada. It was also ranked by Golf Digest as one of the top ten courses in Atlantic Canada in 2002. This seaside course that crosses two salmon rivers, has been often referred to as "Canada's Pebble Beach."

See also
List of golf courses in Newfoundland and Labrador

References

External links
Official website

Golf clubs and courses in Newfoundland and Labrador
1984 establishments in Newfoundland and Labrador